The 2019 Super GT Series was a motor racing championship based in Japan for grand touring cars. The series is sanctioned by the Japan Automobile Federation (JAF) and run by the GT Association (GTA). It was the twenty-seventh season of the Japan Automobile Federation Super GT Championship which includes the All Japan Grand Touring Car Championship (JGTC) era and the fifteenth season the series has competed under the Super GT name. It was the thirty-seventh overall season of a national JAF sportscar championship dating back to the All Japan Sports Prototype Championship. The season began on April 14 and ended on November 24, after 8 championship races & 2 non-championship races.

As the culmination of a unified set of technical regulations adopted by Super GT and the Deutsche Tourenwagen Masters (DTM), the two series staged a joint-promotion race, the Super GT x DTM Dream Race at Fuji Speedway.

Calendar

Calendar changes
 In light of the series' partnership with the Deutsche Tourenwagen Masters, two races featured entries from both Super GT and DTM. The first was the DTM season finale at the Hockenheimring, where one team from each GT500 manufacturer was invited to take part as a wildcard entry. The second event was the Super GT x DTM Dream Race at Fuji Speedway, featuring all GT500 teams and seven teams representing DTM manufacturers Audi and BMW. A balance of performance formula was applied to ensure parity between DTM and GT500 cars, as Super GT would not adopt Class One regulations in their entirety until 2020. And for both joint-promoted events, all teams used Hankook tyres.
 The auto sport Web Sprint Cup, a non-championship event for GT3 and GT300 competitors, was held at Fuji Speedway as a supporting event of the Super GT x DTM Dream Race.
The Autopolis GT 300 km Race moved forward in the calendar to September 8, to the sixth round of the championship. The Sportsland Sugo round moved to the penultimate round of the season.
 The final round at Motegi was moved forward a week to avoid clashes with the FIA World Endurance Championship and Super Taikyu Series.

Teams and drivers

GT500

GT300

Vehicle Changes

GT500 

 Toyota announced that the fifth-generation GR Supra would replace the Lexus LC 500 as the company's GT500 vehicle beginning in 2020. This was the final season for the Lexus marque in GT500, which had first appeared in 2006.

GT300 

 apr Racing launched an all-new version of their Toyota Prius GT, based on the fourth-generation Prius PHV. This new Prius, with a front-engine, rear-wheel drive configuration, replaced their previous mid-engined Prius GT - which was ruled out of competition due to a regulation change stating that GT300 cars must have their engines located in the same position as their production counterparts.
 ARTA and Team UPGarage changed vehicles to the Honda NSX GT3, replacing their previous BMW M6 GT3 and Toyota MC86, respectively.
 The second-generation Aston Martin Vantage GT3 made its Super GT debut via D'station Racing AMR, who replaced their previous Porsche 911 GT3-R.
 The McLaren 720S GT3 made its Japanese racing debut via McLaren Customer Racing Japan.

Entrant Changes

GT500 

 Honda: Honda announced their GT500 lineups on 11 January. Modulo became the new title sponsor for Nakajima Racing, who formed an all-new driver lineup featuring ex-Super Formula driver Narain Karthikeyan, and Tadasuke Makino, who returned to Japan after racing in Europe for two seasons. Bertrand Baguette transferred to Keihin Real Racing, where he partnered Koudai Tsukakoshi. And former F1 and GT500 driver Shinji Nakano became the new team director of Team Mugen.
 Lexus: Toyota Gazoo Racing announced the Lexus GT500 lineups on 7 February. Kenta Yamashita transferred to Lexus Team Wako's LeMans, replacing Felix Rosenqvist, who left Super GT to compete in the IndyCar Series. Sho Tsuboi and Yuichi Nakayama moved up to GT500 on a full-time basis, with Tsuboi joining Lexus Team WedsSport Bandoh, and Nakayama joining Lexus Team SARD to take the place of Kamui Kobayashi, who left Super GT to focus on the WEC. Yuji Tachikawa was named the team director of Lexus Team ZENT Cerumo, along with his duties as lead driver.
 Nissan: Nissan announced their GT500 lineups on 7 February. NDDP Racing with B-Max formed an all-new driver lineup: Kohei Hirate transferred to Nissan and secured his return to GT500 after a seventeen-year association with Toyota, while former Honda GT500 driver Frédéric Makowiecki returned to the series for the first time since 2014. They replaced Satoshi Motoyama, who had retired from GT500 driving, and Katsumasa Chiyo, who accepted a new assignment in the SRO Intercontinental GT Challenge. Masahiro Hasemi also retired as team director of NDDP Racing with B-Max, and was replaced by Toshikazu Tanaka. James Rossiter rejoined Super GT on a full-time basis and completed a transfer from Toyota to Nissan, joining Team Impul. Jann Mardenborough transferred to Kondo Racing, where he replaced the departing João Paulo de Oliveira.

GT300 

 Kondo Racing, in partnership with the Nissan Automobile Technical College, expanded to a multi-class effort with the addition of a GT300 team. Kazuki Hiramine, who drove for Kondo Racing in Super Taikyu, transferred from JLOC. Former Renault Sport Academy driver Sacha Fenestraz made his Super GT debut with the team.
 Virtual YouTuber  became the new primary sponsor for Pacific Racing with Good Speed, replacing Gulf Oil, which had sponsored Pacific since 2016. 2012 GT300 Champions Naoki Yokomizo and Kyosuke Mineo reunited at the wheel of their Porsche 911 GT3-R.
 Hong Kong-based team X Works made their series debut, fielding a Nissan GT-R NISMO GT3. Two drivers from Hong Kong, Marchy Lee and Shaun Thong, were announced as the full-time driver lineup. The team featured a new sponsorship deal to promote the animated series Neon Genesis Evangelion.
 Team Taisan, EIcars Bentley, and CarGuy Racing all withdrew from Super GT at the end of the 2018 season. Team Taisan had participated in all but one JGTC/Super GT season since the inaugural 1994 season, but shifted focus towards EV racing. CarGuy Racing began new programmes for the 24 Hours of Le Mans and Asian Le Mans Series.
 2013 GT300 Champion Yuhki Nakayama joined apr Racing, driving the number 31 Prius PHV GT alongside Koki Saga. Two-time GT300 champion Manabu Orido, who joined the number 30 apr team halfway through the 2018 season, was named as a full-time driver for 2019 alongside Hiroaki Nagai.
 Former Honda GT500 driver Kosuke Matsuura joined Takashi Kobayashi at Team UPGarage.
 Honda young driver Nirei Fukuzumi joined Shinichi Takagi at ARTA; Fukuzumi raced in Formula 2 and Super Formula in 2018, and made a one-off appearance for ARTA in the 2015 Suzuka 1000 km.
 Team Goh, who won the 1996 GT500 Championship as Team Lark McLaren GTR, returned to Super GT for the first time in 23 years as McLaren Customer Racing Japan. Seiji Ara, who won the 2004 24 Hours of Le Mans with Team Goh, returned to the series after a one-year absence. Former All-Japan Formula Three and European Formula 3 driver Álex Palou made his Super GT debut.
 K-Tunes Racing spun off from LM Corsa after the 2018 season, and continued to receive technical support from INGING Motorsport. Former Honda young driver Sena Sakaguchi transferred into the Toyota programme, joining Morio Nitta aboard the K-Tunes Lexus RC F GT3.
 LM Corsa changed tyre suppliers from Yokohama to Dunlop.
 Keishi Ishikawa transferred to GAINER, driving their number 10 Nissan GT-R NISMO GT3 alongside two-time GT300 champion Kazuki Hoshino.
 D'station Racing AMR signed former Nissan GT500 driver João Paulo de Oliveira to partner Tomonobu Fujii in their new Aston Martin Vantage GT3. Aston Martin factory driver Darren Turner was announced as their third driver for the Fuji 500 Mile Race.
 Kimiya Sato transferred from JLOC to Tsuchiya Engineering, joining 2016 GT300 champion Takamitsu Matsui.
 Saitama Toyopet GreenBrave changed tyre suppliers from Yokohama to Bridgestone. Hiroki Yoshida transferred from Gainer to GreenBrave, partnering Shigekazu Wakisaka.
 JLOC announced brand new driver lineups for both cars. The flagship number 88 car featured 2010 GT500 champion Takashi Kogure, who had recently departed Honda after 15 seasons as a GT500 driver, and Yuya Motojima, who moved over from the number 87 car. Tsubasa Takahashi, who was a third driver in the number 87 car in 2018, became a full-time driver, partnering 2015 GT300 champion André Couto, who returned to the series for the first time since 2017.

Results

Championship Standings

Drivers' championships

Scoring system

GT500

Notes:

‡ – The race at Okayama was red flagged after completing 30 laps. Due to less than 75% of the scheduled distance being completed, half points were awarded to the classified finishers.

GT300

Notes:

‡ – The race at Okayama was red flagged after completing 30 laps. Due to less than 75% of the scheduled distance being completed, half points were awarded to the classified finishers.

Notes

References

External links
 Super GT official website

2019
Super GT Series, 2019